11 Canis Majoris is a single star in the southern constellation of Canis Major, the eleventh entry in John Flamsteed's catalogue of stars in that constellation. It has a blue-white hue and is visible to the naked eye with an apparent visual magnitude of 5.28. The distance to this star is approximately 1,010 light years from the Sun based on parallax, and it is drifting further away with a radial velocity of around +15 km/s. It has an absolute magnitude of −1.63.

This star has a stellar classification of B8/9III, matching a B-type star that is in the giant stage. It has a high rate of spin with a projected rotational velocity of 130 km/s. The star is radiating 485 times the luminosity of the Sun from its photosphere at an effective temperature of 11,540 K.

References

B-type giants
Canis Major
Durchmusterung objects
Canis Majoris, 11
049229
032492
2504